Denis Wojcik is an American author from Flower Mound, Texas. Denis has written four novels including CrossRoads (2005), TurnBack (2006), Linked (2009), and Evil Behind the Smile (2010).

Works 
 CrossRoads, 2005
 TurnBack, 2006
 Linked, 2009
 Evil Behind the Smile, 2010

References

External links 
 Denis Wojcik Official Website

Living people
Year of birth missing (living people)
21st-century American novelists
American male novelists
21st-century American male writers